Cotswold is a range of hills in central England.

Cotswold or Cotswolds may also refer to:

Places, events, and things named after the Cotswolds hills in England

Places
Cotswold, Ontario, a small community in Wellington County, Ontario, Canada
Cotswold District, a local government district in Gloucestershire, England
Cotswold Water Park, a series of lakes on the Gloucestershire-Wiltshire border, England
Cotswold Way, a long-distance footpath from Bath to Chipping Campden, England
Severn-Cotswold tomb, a type of megalithic burial chamber in the Cotswold-Severn Group, England
The Cotswolds (UK Parliament constituency) within Gloucestershire, England

Arts, entertainment, and media
Cotswold Morris, a type of Morris dance
The Cotswolds, a symphony by Gustav Holst

Events and sports
Cotswold Chase, an annual horse race run at Cheltenham, England
Cotswold Games, annual games held in Chipping Campden, Gloucestershire, England

Other namesakes
Cotswold cheese, a variation of Double Gloucester cheese with chives and onions
Cotswold Line, a railway line between Oxford and Hereford, England
Cotswold Outdoor, a chain of adventure recreation shops
Cotswold Rail, a locomotive hire company
Cotswold sheep, a breed noted for its wool
Cotswold stone, a yellow oolitic Jurassic limestone found in the Cotswolds, England

Other uses
Cotswold (Charlotte neighborhood), a neighborhood in Charlotte, North Carolina, USA